Ruharo Mission Hospital is a community hospital in Uganda. It is affiliated with the Anglican Church of Uganda.

Location
The hospital is located in the neighborhood called Ruharo, in 
Kamukuzi Division of the city of Mbarara, in Mbarara District, in the Ankole sub-region of the Western Region of Uganda. The geographical coordinates of the hospital are: 0°36'46.0"S, 30°37'52.0"E (Latitude:-0.612778; Longitude:30.631111).

Overview
The institution is a private, non-profit, community hospital with a bed capacity of 100. The hospital is a fee-paying hospital, although no one is turned away due to inability to pay. The fees collected from the patients partially cover the total hospital expenses.

Ruharo Mission Hospital was founded in 1981 by the late Bishop Amos Betungura, at that time the Bishop of East Ankole Diocese of the Church of Uganda. Later the hospital was taken over by the Ankole Diocese of the Church of Uganda. The following subsidiaries are owned by Ruharo Mission Hospital, either in full or in part. (a) General Medical Services (b) Ruharo Mission Eye Centre (c) Organized Useful Rehabilitation Services (d) St. Johns Health Centre, in Katojo – Biharwe (e) Ibanda Mission Health Centre in Ibanda and (f) St. Luke Clinic in Kisyoro, Isingiro District.

Accreditation
The hospital is accredited by the  Uganda Ministry of Health and by the Uganda Protestant Medical Bureau. It is owned by the Ankole Diocese of the Church of Uganda and is administered by the Hospital Management Committee.

See also
Hospitals in Uganda
Kisiizi

References

External links
 Official Webpage

Hospital buildings completed in 1981
Hospitals in Uganda
Mbarara District
Ankole sub-region
Western Region, Uganda
1981 establishments in Uganda